Ocko I tom Brok (de Broke) (about 1345–1389) followed his father Keno I tom Brok as chieftain of the Brokmerland and the Auricherland in East Frisia, a former territory on Germany's North Sea coast.

According to tradition, he lived in the 1370s in Italy and was knighted by Queen Joanna I of Naples for his military and court services. After the death of his father in 1376 Ocko returned to his homeland in 1378. After heavy fighting against Folkmar Allena, he initially united almost all of East Frisia under his rule. In 1389 he was murdered near the district of Aurich Castle. 

Ocko I tom Brok married Foelke Kampana of Hinte (known locally as Quade Foelke). They had the following issue:
 Keno II tom Brok (married Adda Idzinga of Norden),
 Tetta tom Brok (married Sibrand of Loquard),
 Ocka tom Brok (married Lütet Attena of Dornum and Nesse).
His eldest, but illegitimate son was Widzeld tom Brok, (d. 25 April 1399), who succeeded his father as chieftain after he had been murdered.

East Frisian chieftains
14th-century births
1389 deaths